Stampriet is a village in Hardap Region, Namibia.

History
Stampriet was founded in 1898 as a trading post in what was then German South West Africa. It was the scene of many battles between German and Nama troops. In 1970, the population included 70 whites, 1 mixed-race person, and 195 blacks.

The name Stampriet is an Afrikaans translation of the Khoekhoe name Aams. Given that stamp is Afrikaans for "bump," and riet is Afrikaans for "reed," it is likely named ever after the reeds one must trample to reach the watering hole or as a place where the "reed dance" or Umhlanga (ceremony), the famed royal ritual in southern Africa, was held. At first it was called Stamprietfontein, but the suffix was abandoned later.

Economy and infrastructure
The local boreholes are strong, sometimes yielding up to 3.5 million liters of water a day, allowing local farmers to irrigate grain crops, especially corn and lucerne. 

Stampriet is home to Privatskool Elnatan, founded in April 1992 and growing to educate 370 students in grades 1 through 12 with a staff of 61 (including teachers, administrators, groundskeepers, and dormitory staff). Due to the town's small size, 80% of students live in the school's four dormitories, coming from around the country since few private schools in Namibia offer Afrikaans-language education through grade 12. All instruction is in Afrikaans except for the vocational department.

Politics
Stampriet is governed by a village council that has five seats.

In the 2010 local authority election, a total of 349 votes were cast in the village. SWAPO won with approximately 74% of the vote. Of the three other parties seeking seats, Rally for Democracy and Progress (RDP) received approximately 20% of the vote, followed by Democratic Turnhalle Alliance (DTA, 5%) and the Congress of Democrats (CoD) which received 0 votes despite being on the ballot. SWAPO also won the 2015 election and gained four seats (460 votes). The remaining seat went to the DTA which obtained 63 votes.

In the 2020 local authority election "serious procedural errors" were discovered for the Stampriet village council. Some voters had been handed ballot papers without being registered as living in the village, as is required for the local authority election. No initial result were announced, and the electoral court ordered a re-run. The re-run was conducted on 26 February 2021 and won by the newly formed Landless People's Movement (LPM). LPM gained 353 votes and three seats in the village council, followed by SWAPO with two seats (272 votes).

People
Former Namibian Rugby star Jacques Burger resides in Stampriet.

References

Notes

Literature
 (af) Elnatan Private School website. URL accessed January 13 2016.
 (en) Potgieter, D.J. (edit.) 1974. Standard Encyclopaedia of Southern Africa. Cape Town: Nasou Limited.
 (en) Raper, Peter Edmund. 2004. New Dictionary of South African Place Names. Johannesburg & Cape Town: Jonathan Ball Publishers.

Villages in Namibia
Populated places in the Hardap Region
Populated places established in 1898
1898 establishments in German South West Africa